Hamad Al-Marzouqi (Arabic:حمد المرزوقي) (born 18 December 1996) is an Emirati footballer. He currently plays as a right back Al Dhafra.

Career

Al Dhafra
Al-Marzouqi started his career at Al Dhafra and is a product of the Al Dhafra's youth system. On 21 September 2017, Al-Marzouqi made his professional debut for Al Dhafra against Al-Sharjah in the Pro League, replacing Khaled Butti.

Hatta (loan)
On 15 January 2020 left Al Dhafra and signed with Hatta on loan until the end of the season. On 29 January 2020, Al-Marzouqi made his professional debut for Hatta against Shabab Al-Ahli in the Pro League. On 28 June 2020 signed again with Hatta on loan from Al Dhafra of the season 2020-2021.

External links

References

1996 births
Living people
Emirati footballers
Al Dhafra FC players
Hatta Club players
UAE Pro League players
Association football fullbacks
Place of birth missing (living people)